Parliamentary elections were held in the People's Republic of Albania on 10 July 1966.
The Democratic Front was the only party able to contest the elections, and subsequently won all 240 seats. Voter turnout was reported to be 100%, with only four registered voters not voting.

Results

References

Parliamentary elections in Albania
Albania
1966 in Albania
One-party elections
Albania